Dewey (also Gibraltar) is an unincorporated community in Skagit County, Washington, United States.

History
The community was originally called Deception, then Fidalgo City and renamed in 1898 after George Dewey, a naval officer in the Spanish–American War. An interurban railway was completed between Anacortes and Fidalgo City in 1891 with the sole purpose of securing land grants, as it ran with a minimum number of trips before ceasing operations.

Notes

Unincorporated communities in Skagit County, Washington
Unincorporated communities in Washington (state)